

Climate

Okehi is a Local Government Area in Kogi State, Nigeria. Its headquarters are in the town of Obangede. 
It has an area of 661 km and a population of 199,999 at the 2006 census.

The postal code of the area is 264.

References

Local Government Areas in Kogi State